Fenland District Council in the Isle of Ely, Cambridgeshire, England is elected every four years. Since the last boundary changes in 2015, 39 councillors are returned from 24 wards.
The elections are held concurrently with the local government elections for Chatteris Town Council, March Town Council, Whittlesey Town Council, Wisbech Town Council and the other parish councils in the district (except for the 1979 local elections), when the general election was held with district elections and the town and parish elections were pushed back to 24 May 1979.

Fenland rejected the introduction of a directly elected mayor by 17,296 votes to 5,509, on a turnout of just under 34%, in a referendum held in July 2005.

The Electoral Reform Society declared Fenland District Council top of the Rotten Boroughs table in the 2019 elections. 12 councillors out of 39 – all Conservative – were returned unopposed.

Political control
Since the foundation of the council in 1973 political control of the council has been held by the following parties:

Leadership
The leaders of the council since 2014 have been:

Council elections

Composition since 1973

Notes:

District result maps

By-election results

1995-1999

1999-2003

2003-2007

2007-2011

2011-2015

This by-election was due to the Conservative incumbent cllr Farmer being disqualified for a firearms offence. This was cllr Tierney's third attempt to win a seat on FDC.

2015-2019

2019-2023

References

 By-election results

External links
 Fenland District Council

 
Council elections in Cambridgeshire
Fenland District
District council elections in England